Imago (Имаго) is the third full-length album by the Russian Power Metal band Catharsis. It was released in 2003 by Irond. It is a Russian language twin to the 2002 English language album Imago.

Track listing
 1'33'' до... (1'33'' do...) [remix]  – 2:10 - 1'33'' Until... 
 Имаго (Imago)  – 3:51 - Imago 
 Сердце мира (Serdtse mira)  – 4:14 - Heart of the World 
 Взорви мои сны (Vzorvi moi sny)  – 4:00 - Shatter My Dreams
 Дальше - тишина... (Dal'she - tishina...)  – 4:50 - Silence Flows... 
 Избранный небом (Izbrannyi nebom)  – 4:31 - Chosen by Heaven 
 Рассветный зверь (Rassvetnyi zver')  – 4:51 - Sunrise Beast 
 Тарантул (Tarantul) [remix])  – 4:01 - Tarantul (Instrumental) 
 Танцуй в огне (Tantsui v ogne)  – 4:09 - Dance in the Fire 
 Звездопад (Zvezdopad)  – 4:13 - Star Waterfall 
 Воин света (Voin sveta)  – 4:51 - Warrior of Light
 Иди за солнцем (Idi za solntsem)  – 4:04 - Follow The Sun (Bonus Track)

The album also contains a bonus video track Imago.

Members
Oleg Zhilyakov - Vocals, Back Vocals
Igor Polyakov - Rhythm Guitar, Acoustic Guitar
Julia Red - Keyboards
Oleg Mission - Lead guitar, Acoustic Guitar, Flute
Andrey Ischenko - Drums, Percussion
Alexander Timonin - Bass

2003 albums
Catharsis (Russian band) albums

ru:Имаго (альбом)